Gøhril Jeanne Gabrielsen (born 14 January 1961) is a Norwegian writer. She grew up in Finnmark, but then moved to Oslo. Gabrielsen's debut novel Unevnelige hendelser (Unspeakable Events) came out in 2006 winning Aschehoug’s First Book Award. She has published several other novels, including Svimlende muligheter, ingen frykt (The Looking-Glass Sisters) 2008, Skadedyr (Vermin) 2011, Din, alltid (Yours, Always) 2015 and Ankomst (Arrival) 2017, all well received by critics. The Looking-Glass Sisters has been released in English translation by Peirene Press.

Bibliography 

 Unspeakable Events, 2006
 The Looking-Glass Sisters, 2008
 Vermin, 2011
 Yours, Always, 2015
 Arrival, 2017

Awards 

 Aschehoug’s First Book Award, 2006
 Tanums Woman Scholarship, 2008
 Amalie Skram Prize, 2016
 Havmann Prize, 2017

References

1961 births
Living people
People from Finnmark
Norwegian women novelists
21st-century Norwegian novelists
21st-century Norwegian women writers